Mahatma Montessori Matriculation Higher Secondary School is a school in Madurai in the state of Tamil Nadu in southern India.

References

Montessori schools in India
High schools and secondary schools in Tamil Nadu
Schools in Madurai